Vicky Chen (born Chen Hsin-yue on November 20, 1995) is a Taiwanese Mandopop singer-songwriter.

Early life and education 
Chen was born on November 20, 1995, in Taipei, Taiwan. She majored in English at Fu Jen Catholic University.

Musical career 
Chen participated in Jungle Voice 2, a Taiwanese reality singing competition, in 2019. Her 2017 single "Smokescreen" went viral.

Discography 

 Am I Who I Am (2020)

References

External links 
 

1995 births
Living people
21st-century Taiwanese women singers
Musicians from Taipei
Fu Jen Catholic University alumni